Grete Reinwald (25 May 1902 – 24 May 1983) was a German stage and film actress. As a child, due to her sweet, appealing features she modeled for many monochrome, hand-tinted and autochrome postcards. Her siblings Hanni Reinwald and Otto Reinwald were also actors.

Selected filmography
 The Night of Decision (1920)
 Youth (1922)
 William Tell (1923)
 The Comedian's Child (1923)
 The Woman on the Panther (1923)
 Time Is Money (1923)
 Set Me Free (1924)
 The Gallows Bride (1924)
 The Four Marriages of Matthias Merenus (1924)
 Heart of Stone (1924)
 The Woman without Money (1925)
 The Assmanns (1925)
 What the Stones Tell (1925)
 Goetz von Berlichingen of the Iron Hand (1925)
 Golden Boy (1925)
 Ship in Distress (1925)
 Frisian Blood (1925)
 People of the Sea (1925)
 German Hearts on the German Rhine (1926)
 Fräulein Mama (1926)
 The Hunter of Fall (1926)
 The Eleven Schill Officers (1926)
 Assassination (1927)
 I Stand in the Dark Midnight (1927)
 On the Banks of the River Weser (1927)
 Rutschbahn (1928)
 Give Me Life (1928)
 Autumn on the Rhine (1928)
 Kolonne X (1929)
 Big City Children (1929)
 Hans Westmar (1933)
 Women for Golden Hill (1938)
 Stern von Rio (1940)
 The Scapegoat (1940)
 The Great Love (1942)
 Who Is This That I Love? (1950)
 Captive Soul (1952)
 The Chaplain of San Lorenzo (1953)

References

External links

1902 births
1983 deaths
German stage actresses
German film actresses
German silent film actresses
German child actresses
Actresses from Stuttgart
20th-century German actresses